Blind Bay is an unincorporated settlement located on the bay of the same name, at the southwest end of Shuswap Lake in the Shuswap region of the Southern Interior of British Columbia, Canada.
   
Part of Blind Bay is a golf course community with numerous other recreation activities including a grass air strip, tennis, pickleball, hiking, and model airplane flying.

At the 2021 census, the population of Blind Bay was 2,369.

References

External links

Designated places in British Columbia
Populated places in the Columbia-Shuswap Regional District
Shuswap Country
Unincorporated settlements in British Columbia